Hisateru (written 久晃 or 久照) is a masculine Japanese given name. Notable people with the name include:

, Japanese sumo wrestler
, Japanese rugby union player

Japanese masculine given names